Jeremiah Taverner (active 1690–1706) was a British portrait painter.

Not much is known about Taverner except through his works. He painted primarily portraits, and a number of them were used to produce engravings done by other artists. A number of these works can be found at the National Portrait Gallery, London. He was the father of William Taverner, a lawyer; and grandfather of William Taverner, b. 1703, a judge and watercolourist.

References

17th-century English painters
English male painters
English portrait painters
Year of birth unknown
Year of death unknown